Derek Alexander Stirling (born 5 October 1961) is a former New Zealand cricketer who played in six Test matches and six One Day Internationals from 1984 to 1986.

He played Scottish club cricket for Stenhousemuir in 1983 and 1984. He also played for Menston CC in Yorkshire in 1985 and 1986 and for the Rest of the World XI in Scarborough in 1985.

References

External links

 "Busy Derek 'Billy' Stirling is sailing through life"

1961 births
Living people
Sportspeople from Upper Hutt
New Zealand cricketers
New Zealand Test cricketers
New Zealand One Day International cricketers
Central Districts cricketers
Wellington cricketers
People educated at Palmerston North Boys' High School